2011 Desafio Internacional das Estrelas was the seventh edition of Desafio Internacional das Estrelas (International Challenge of the Stars) with Lucas di Grassi as the defending champion. Races scheduled for 3–4 December at Arena Sapiens Park in Florianópolis-SC. The event was won by Jaime Alguersuari after he came 2nd in  Race 1 and won Race 2.

Participants

Classification

Qualifying

Race 1

Race 2

Final Classification

References

External links
  

Desafio Internacional das Estrelas
Desafio Internacional das Estrelas
December 2011 sports events in South America